Plainville is a census-designated place (CDP) in Hamilton County, Ohio, United States. The population was 120 at the 2020 census.

Geography
Plainville is part of the Greater Cincinnati area and the Mariemont City School District. Many of the residences and structures are from the 19th century, and the old Plainville School which was built in 1910 and closed in 1957 still stands on Walton Creek Road and now serves as the home theater for the Mariemont Players theater troupe.

Demographics

References

Census-designated places in Hamilton County, Ohio
Census-designated places in Ohio